Waianapanapa State Park is a  state park in Hana, on the island of Maui, in Hawaii. Waianapanapa means “glistening fresh water” in the Hawaiian language, referring to nearby fresh water streams and sparkling pools. The camp offers camping facilities, including a small lawn where campers may pitch a tent, and a public bathroom nearby.

Tide pools at the park turn red several times of a year. Scientists state that it is due to of the arrival of small shrimp, however local folklore says it's the blood of Popoaleae, a mythical princess who was murdered in a nearby lava tube by her husband, Chief Ka'akea.

Natural features

Waianapanapa State Park's natural features include:
seabird colonies
anchialine pools
native hala (Pandanus tectorius)
coastal mesic forests
lava tubes
heiau (religious temples)
a natural arch
sea stacks
blowholes
a small black sand beach.

See also

List of Hawaii state parks

References

External links
Waiʻānapanapa State Park at Hawaii.gov
Hawaii State Parks: Official Waiʻānapanapa State Park website

Protected areas of Maui
State parks of Hawaii
Beaches of Maui